The Flying Dutchman or  De Vliegende Hollander is a 1957 Dutch biographical film directed by Gerard Rutten about the life of famed aviator Anthony Fokker.

Plot

The film centers around Fokkers first years as he starts up his aeroplane factory. With trial and error he eventually manages to make trustworthy planes and set up a company.

Cast
Ton Kuyl - Anthony Fokker
Mimi Boesnach - Mother of Anthony Fokker
Cruys Voorbergh		
Coen Flink		
Bob De Lange		
Guus Oster		
Bernard Droog		
Paul Huf		
Lies Franken		
Sophie van Dijk

External links 
 

1957 films
Dutch black-and-white films
Dutch biographical drama films
Dutch war drama films
World War I aviation films
World War I films based on actual events
Aviation films
Biographical films about military personnel
1950s Dutch-language films
1950s war drama films
Cultural depictions of Anthony Fokker
Films set in the Netherlands
Films directed by Gerard Rutten
1950s biographical drama films
1957 drama films
Films scored by Henk Badings